Opel Vivaro, a light commercial vehicle, which is also sold in the United Kingdom as the Vauxhall Vivaro, may refer to:

 The Opel Vivaro A, based on the second-generation Renault Trafic, and was produced between 2001 and 2014
 The Opel Vivaro B, based on the third-generation Renault Trafic, and was produced between 2014 and 2018
 The Opel Vivaro C, based on the third-generation Citroën Jumpy, after the entry of the Opel/Vauxhall brand in PSA Group, and is currently produced from 2019

External links 

  (Ireland)

Vivaro
Cars introduced in 2001